USS John C. Calhoun (SSBN-630), a  fleet ballistic missile submarine, was the only ship of the United States Navy to be named for John C. Calhoun (1782–1850), the Democratic legislator and statesman.

Construction and commissioning
The contract to build John C. Calhoun was awarded to Newport News Shipbuilding and Dry Dock Company in Newport News, Virginia, on 20 July 1961 and her keel was laid down there on 4 June 1962.  She was launched on 22 June 1963 sponsored by Miss Rosalie J. Calhoun, great-great-granddaughter of John C. Calhoun, and commissioned on 15 September 1964, with Commander Deane L. Axene in command of the Blue Crew and Commander Frank A. Thurtell in command of the Gold Crew.

Operational history
After shakedown and training along the United States East Coast, John C. Calhoun began operational deterrent patrols on 22 March 1965, assigned to Submarine Squadron 18.

History from 1965 to 1994 needed.

From 1979 to 1982, John C. Calhoun received upgrades necessary to enable her to carry the new Trident I ballistic missiles.

Decommissioning and disposal
John C. Calhoun was decommissioned on 28 March 1994 at Bremerton, Washington, and stricken from the Naval Vessel Register the same day. Her scrapping via the Nuclear-Powered Ship and Submarine Recycling Program at Bremerton, Washington, was completed on 18 November 1994.

References 

 
 

 

James Madison-class submarines
Cold War submarines of the United States
Nuclear submarines of the United States Navy
1963 ships
Ships built in Newport News, Virginia